Sarbananda Sonowal (Assamese: সৰ্বানন্দ সোণোৱাল / IPA: xɔɹbanɔndɔ xʊnʊwal; born 31 October 1962) is an Indian politician from Assam who is serving as the current Cabinet Minister of Ports, Shipping and Waterways and Cabinet Minister of AYUSH in the Government of India since 2021. He is also a Member of Parliament in the Rajya Sabha from Assamand also a member of the Cabinet Committee on Political Affairs since 2021. He is 14th Chief Minister of Assam and a former Member of the Legislative Assembly (India) in Assam Legislative Assembly from 2016 to 2021. Sonowal earlier served as the Assam state President of Bharatiya Janata Party (BJP) from 2012 to 2014 and again in 2015 to 2016. He has also served as the Minister for Sports and Youth Affairs, Government of India, from 2014 to 2016.

Early life and education
Sarbananda Sonowal was born on 31 October 1962 to an Assamese Hindu family in Muluk Gaon located in the Dibrugarh district of Assam to Jibeswar Sonowal (father) and Dineswari Sonowal (mother). 

Sonowal did his schooling at Don Bosco High School, Dibrugarh. He completed his B.A.(Hons) in English from Dibrugarh Hanumanbax Surajmall Kanoi College under Dibrugarh University and his LLB form  Dibrugarh University and B.C.J from Gauhati University.

Political career

Sarbananda Sonowal was the President of Assam's oldest student body, the All Assam Students Union (AASU) from 1992 to 1999. After that, he became a member of the Asom Gana Parishad (AGP). In 2001, he was elected as the MLA from Moran constituency of Assam. In 2004, he became a Lok Sabha member representing the Dibrugarh constituency. He lost Lok Sabha election from Dibrugarh in 2009. He joined Bharatiya Janata Party (BJP) in 2011.

He was appointed president of BJP's Assam Unit in 2012 and is also a member of the party's National Executive. In the 2014 general election for Lok Sabha he was appointed to head Assam State's Lok Sabha Elections by BJP, and in the same year he was also elected as Member of Parliament, 16th Lok Sabha, from Lakhimpur Constituency. He was then appointed as Union Minister of State-Independent Charge, of the Government of India under the Modi Government at the center.

He was selected as the CM candidate of BJP for the 2016 Assam Assembly Election. On 19 May 2016, Sarbananda Sonowal won the Assembly Election from Majuli Constituency, and he became Chief Minister of Assam, the first CM of the state from Bharatiya Janata Party. In 2021 he was re-elected to Assam Vidhan Sabha from Majuli. He resigned as Chief Minister and proposed Himanta Biswa Sarma's name as his successor. He became Minister of Ports, Shipping and Waterways and Minister of AYUSH in Second Modi ministry when cabinet overhaul happened.

Personal life

Sarbananda Sonowal resigned from all executive posts within AGP and left the party, due to dissatisfaction with and amongst the senior leadership of the party who were trying to forge an alliance with a party that was against the scrapping of the controversial IMDT Act. On 8 February 2011, Sonowal joined BJP in the presence of the then BJP National President Nitin Gadkari and senior leaders like Varun Gandhi, Vijay Goel, Bijoya Chakravarty and state BJP president Ranjit Dutta. He was immediately appointed as a member of the BJP National Executive and later on the State Spokesperson of the BJP unit, prior to his current assignment to head the state as the new president. On 28 January 2016, BJP Parliamentary Board announced Sarbananda Sonowal as BJP Chief Ministerial candidate of Assam. He is not married.

Positions held

2001-2004: Elected as MLA, Assam Legislative Assembly from Moran Constituency
2004: Elected as Member of Parliament, 14th Lok Sabha from Dibrugarh Constituency
2005: Appointed Member, Consultative Committee, Ministry of Home Affairs
2006: Appointed Member, Consultative Committee, Ministry of Commerce & Industry
2011: Appointed as National Executive Member of Bharatiya Janata Party
2011: Appointed as State Spokesperson and General Secretary for Assam Bharatiya Janata Party
2012: Appointed as State President for Assam Bharatiya Janata Party
2014: Appointed to head State's 16th Lok Sabha Elections Assam Bharatiya Janata Party
2014: Elected as Member of Parliament, 16th Lok Sabha from Lakhimpur Constituency
2014: Appointed as Union Minister of State-Independent Charge, Republic of India
2016: Declared as BJP Chief minister candidate for 2016 Assam assembly elections.
 2016-2021: Member of Assam Legislative Assembly from Majuli Constituency 
 2016–2021: 14th Chief Minister of Assam
 2021–present: Minister of Ports, Shipping and Waterways and Minister of AYUSH in the Government of India
 2021–present: Member of the Cabinet Committee on Political Affairs in the Government of India
 2021–present: Member of Parliament, Rajya Sabha

Social and cultural activities

 President - All Assam Students Union, 1992–1999
 Chairman - North East Students Organisation, 1996–2000

Arts & culture

The annual Guwahati International Film Festival was started during his tenure. It is organised by the State Government-owned Jyoti Chitraban (Film Studio) Society in association with the Dr. Bhupen Hazarika Regional Government Film and Television Institute. The first edition was held in Oct 2018. The second, in Oct-Nov 2019. The 3rd edition has been postponed owing to the present COVID-19 pandemic to early 2021.

Role removing the IMDT Act

Faced with the problem of massive migration from Bangladesh into Assam, the government tried to put up legislation in place to detect and deport foreign nationals. Eventually, the Illegal Migrants (Determination by Tribunal) Act, 1983 (IMDT Act) came into being following the Assam Accord signed between the Government of India and the All Assam Students Union (AASU) to end the decade-long anti-foreigner agitation.

The IMDT Act is an instrument passed by Indian Parliament to detect illegal immigrants (from Bangladesh) and expel them from Assam. While the IMDT Act operates only in Assam, the Foreigners Act (1946) applies to the rest of the country. It is applicable to those Bangladeshi nationals who settled in Assam on or after 25 March 1971. Under the Act, the onus of proving the citizenship of a suspected illegal alien rests on the complainant, often the police. On the other hand, according to the provisions of the Foreigners Act, the onus lies with the person suspected to be an alien.

Sonowal took the issue of Bangladeshi infiltration to the Supreme Court. By its judgement dated 12 July 2005, the court struck down the Illegal Migrants (Determination by Tribunal) Act, 1983, as unconstitutional and termed Bangladeshi infiltration an "external aggression" and directed that "the Bangladesh nationals who have illegally crossed the border and have trespassed into Assam or are living in other parts of the country have no legal right of any kind to remain in India and they are liable to be deported."

See also
Sonowal Kacharis
All Assam Students Union
Asom Gana Parishad
Sarbananda Sonowal ministry (2016–2021)

References

External links
 Home Page on the Parliament of India's Website
 
 

People from Dibrugarh district
Living people
1961 births
Assamese people
Gauhati University alumni
Dibrugarh University alumni
India MPs 2004–2009
Asom Gana Parishad politicians
Bharatiya Janata Party politicians from Assam
Lok Sabha members from Assam
India MPs 2014–2019
Ministry of Youth Affairs and Sports
Union ministers of state of India with independent charge
Assam MLAs 2001–2006
Assam MLAs 2016–2021
Chief Ministers of Assam
Chief ministers from Bharatiya Janata Party
Ministry of Skill Development and Entrepreneurship
Narendra Modi ministry
Assam MLAs 2021–2026